Germán Gelpi (1909–1982) was an Argentine artist and art director designing sets for films and the theatre. Gelpi worked on more than eighty films in a career that began during the Golden Age of Argentine Cinema.

Selected filmography
 Savage Pampas (1945)
 Where Words Fail (1946)
 From Man to Man (1949)
 The Earring (1951)
 Sucedió en Buenos Aires (1954)

References

Bibliography 
 Pellettieri, Osvaldo. Historia del teatro argentino en las provincias, Volume 2. Editorial Galerna, 2005.

External links 
 

1909 births
1982 deaths
Argentine art directors
People from Buenos Aires